BGYO, also known during their pre-debut as Star Hunt Academy Boys or SHA Boys , is a five-member Filipino boy group that began formation in 2018 by ABS-CBN Star Hunt Academy and debuted in 2021 under ABS-CBN's Star Magic. The quintet—composed of Akira, Gelo, JL, Mikki, and Nate—co-writes several of their output and considered their Filipino roots as one of their assets, as evident in their music, songwriting and style. Their lyrics, often focused on social issues relevant to young generation, hope, youth empowerment and self-love. Acclaimed as the "Aces of P-pop" and the first Filipino Pop group to have their own topic on Twitter.

After debuting in 2021 with their single The Light, BGYO released their first original soundtrack He's Into Her which led to the group's first major recognition for the "Best Theme Song or Title Theme" at the 2021 Asian Academy Creative Awards; also made them the fifth Filipino artist to appear on the weekly Billboard Next Big Sound chart, debuted at number 2 and went straight to number 1 for two consecutive weeks upon the released of their sophomore single The Baddest; the first Filipino act to do so. The group's first multi-lingual studio album The Light has achieved the sought after feat of being the longest consecutive charting album by a Filipino act to stay at number one on iTunes Philippines of all time. By 2022, the group was featured on Xpedition's cover as "The Raging Storm" that marked BGYO as one of the first Filipino celebrities, alongside sister group BINI, to have a NFT magazine cover and the first ever in the Middle East region launched through the Metaverse. Three of their songs—"Kundiman", "He's Into Her", "The Baddest"—were chosen to be part of The Lunar Codex's "Polaris Collection". The group became the only Filipino act, alongside other 6 K-pop idols, to headline the first ever K-pop Halloween Concert in the Philippines—Hallyuween 2022 and the first Filipino act to have a concert in the Metaverse. Following the release of their second album Be Us, the group delivered an extraordinary feat of having 2 albums and 32 tracks on iTunes Philippines Charts at the same time, the first Filipino act to do so.

Name 

The group's name is an acronym for "Becoming the change, Going further, You and I, Originally Filipino". Contrary to the belief of many, the group's name is not the shortened form of the Filipino word "bagyo", which means storm particularly a tropical cyclone. Their fandom name is collectively called ACEs chosen unanimously by the members among entries from fans; with red and gold as their fandom color demonstrated on the group's official light stick called "The Light", named after BGYO's debut album "The Light".

History

2018–2020: Formation and introduction 

In 2018, ABS-CBN launched the Star Hunt Academy program, a project led by entertainment head Laurenti Dyogi for the purpose of introducing Filipino talent in the international market. 250 auditionees with age range of 16–19 from different places in the Philippines were evaluated, from which the first set of male trainees were selected. It was initially planned to debut a 7-member idol boy group but was minimized to five. The final lineup ended with Akira, Gelo, JL, Mikki, and Nate. They were trained for two years under Filipino and South Korean mentors from MU Doctor Academy. Vocal coach Kitchy Molina and Austrian-native dance coach Mickey Perz were some of the notable Filipino mentors.

On August 3, 2019, the five members were officially introduced as the Star Hunt trainees in the online pre-show of the PBB Otso Big Night through a performance. They had their first outdoor performance with live audience in their first-ever mall show in Taguig. They have also attended in the 2019 Southeast Asian Games thanksgiving celebration.

In May 2020, Dyogi released a dance practice video of Akira, Gelo, Mikki, and Nate dancing to Seventeen's "Let Me Hear You Say" to show their progress in training. In the subsequent months, the academy have released vlogs of the trainees on YouTube and performance videos on Twitter. The group have also invited to perform on the "Happy Hallyu Day 4" which lasted from August 22 and 29. On October 18, BGYO as "SHA Boys" became part of the ASAP Natin 'To and performed BTS' hit song "On". On October 31, they also performed on the "2020 Philippines-Korea Cultural Exchange Festival".

On December 4, 2020, the official debut month of the group in January 2021 was announced, together with the contract signing with Star Magic and record label Star Music. On December 6, the group performed on the opening of Pinoy Big Brother: Connect. On December 12, the group went viral with their It's Showtime's performance of Sarah Geronimo hit songs "Tala"/"Kilometro.

2021-present: Debut and early years

The Light Era 

Ahead of the debut date in 2021, Star Hunt Academy released a series of teasers for the group which on January 13, they revealed the group's official name accompanied with its official logo. MU Doctor collaborated with South Korean producers Rogan & Ddank for BGYO's debut single "The Light" released on January 29. The English lyrics were written by Korean-American composer and songwriter Distract, and the Tagalog lyrics written by the members themselves to "reflect their own story in the song". The single was choreographed by Lay Back, known to have worked with SuperM, Hyolyn, and Zico.

In March 2021, BGYO was featured in the Spring 2021 issue of L'Officiel. BGYO also participated in the collaborative virtual show of ABS-CBN along with other "Kapamilya stars" broadcast through Kumu and Facebook. On March 31, MYX announced the group as their "spotlight artist" for the month of April. On April 9, Star Music officially confirmed that BGYO will sing the official soundtrack of iWantTFC's digital Philippine romance comedy series He's Into Her. On April 21, BGYO performed on the Wish 107.5 Bus with their debut single. On April 23, 2021, the second single He's Into Her has been sent to digital streaming and download platforms with a lyric and music video uploaded on YouTube. On the same day, BGYO was added on the roster of Spotify RADAR program. The group's first collaboration single "Feel Good Pilipinas" was released on May 21, 2021, with KZ Tandingan which was produced as ABS-CBN's 2021 Summer Special ID. On May 17, BGYO participated in the 4th Season of Coke Studio Philippines' "Itodo Mo Beat Mo" where they performed the choreographed rendition of Keiko Necesario's "While We Are Young". Three days after, an original composition of BGYO and Necesario titled "Runnin'" was uploaded on YouTube. On May 29, the group also took part on the virtual red carpet premiere of the series He's Into Her.

In June 2021, "BGYO Live Zoom Party" took place, a virtual international fan meet, held via Zoom and was organized by K-Wave By. Marie INC. and TimelessNotes LIVE, where they performed The Light, "He's Into Her" and a cover of the song Un Año by the Colombian singer-songwriter Sebastián Yatra and the Mexican pop rock band Reik. They also got the chance to be interviewed on SBS PopAsia on June 10. The group also made an appearance on the official debut of their sister group BINI, on June 11. BGYO embarked on their first global caravan named "Feel Good Pilipinas Global Independence Day Caravan" along with various artists, which lasted from June 11–20. They also participated on "ALL FOR ONE (Canadian Multiculturalism Day): Celebrating Unity in Diversity", on June 26. In July 2021, BGYO fronted "The Music Issue" of PARCINQ Magazine with the tagline "P-POP POWER". On August 6, they performed "He's Into Her" on the "He's Into Her : The Benison Ball". On August 7, the group experienced their first ever performance on an award show through MYX Music Awards 2021. On August 20, BGYO released their sophomore single The Baddest, with Liza Soberano on the music video. On August 25, #BGYO was included on Twitter's "Top Hashtags in the Philippines" for the first half of 2021. On August 28–29, the group was invited to perform on the "Happy Hallyu Day 5: A Virtual Fest". "Kulay" was released in September 23 as a theme song of the Miss Universe Philippines 2021 National Costume Competition

In October 2021, the group released their debut album The Light, which includes "The Light", "The Baddest", "He's Into Her"; five new songs "When I'm with You", "Kundiman", "Sabay", "Fly Away" and "Rocketman", four international versions of "The Light"—Bahasa Indonesia, Thai, Spanish and Japanese. On November 6–7, the first ever sibling group concert in the Pinoy pop history, "ONE DREAM: The BINI and BGYO Concert", took place. On November 12, the group took part on the official Christmas theme song of ABS CBN's Christmas Station ID alongside other 19 Kapamilya artists, entitled "Andito Tayo Para sa Isa't Isa". On November 21, a joint virtual fan meet with BGYO's sibling group BINI for their Indonesian and Thai fans, "Global Party Asia Tour", took place. On November 29, BGYO performed on 34th Awit Awards

In December 2021, BGYO appeared and performed on their first international award show through the 2021 Asian Academy Creative Awards, of which, they are also a finalist for the "Best Theme Song" category for "He's Into Her". On December 3, the group plunge into their first international concert, "1MX Dubai 2021 (Filipino Music Festival)", along with various artists in Dubai World Trade Centre, United Arab Emirates.

In February 2022, "ONE DREAM: The BINI and BGYO Concert Version 2022" have been re-broadcast via KTX. On February 27, the group performed in the grand finals of "Uplive World Stage". On March 19, BGYO appeared on "Saludo Excellence Awards 2021". On March 22, the group took part on "Star Magic's 'Beyond the Stars' Trade Event". On March 25, the release of the group's first original soundtrack for 2022, Mahal Na Kita, took place. On April 1, the group's first collaboration single with their sister group BINI, Up!, was released. On April 9–10, BGYO experienced their first Araneta Coliseum performances via "2022 PPOPCON: The Ultimate P-pop Fan Gathering". On April 10, BGYO appeared on the "ABS-CBN and PACE Media Congress Digital Caravan". On April 22, Best Time was released. On May 1, they participated on Xiaomi Fan Festival 2022. On May 2, the group participated on Simply K-Pop Con-Tour as a guest. On May 25, they performed on the "4th Herons Heroes Awards - University of Makati" and "A Light of Hope Virtual Concert: for the Youth, their Moms and Educators". On May 28, they took part on the "Tarlac 149th Founding Anniversary". On June 5, they performed on the PBA 47th Season - Opening. On June 6, they are recognized as the "Best International Artist" on the Korean star voting web application Dong-A.com's "Idolpick (아이돌픽)" for seven consecutive weeks and hailed as the "Best Idol for the month of June" which gave them the opportunity to appear on several digital billboards in Seoul, South Korea. On June 14, Netflix Philippines premiered their first variety show, "Alas Netflix" featuring BGYO on its first 3 episodes.

BE:US 

The release of Tumitigil Ang Mundo on July 13, 2022, marked the new chapter of BGYO's music career. The track is the first single on their upcoming sophomore album. The group also embarked on their first mall tour as BGYO, "Best Time with BGYO Mall Tour", which lasted from July to August 2022. On July 15, the group took part on the "TUGATOG: The Filipino Music Festival 2022" alongside other Pinoy idol groups. The group played a part on the Nickelodeon's Bikini Bottom Bash, a birthday celebration for SpongeBob SquarePants. BGYO also participated on a benefit concert on July 22, "BE YOU: The World will Adjust", together with Red Velvet, BINI and Lady Pipay in the Mall of Asia. They are also part of "Star Magic 30th Anniversary Tour: Beyond The Stars" kick-off, supposedly they will participate on the United States leg of the tour in San Francisco and California but, not materialized. On July 28, BGYO were announced to sing the original soundtrack of the 2022 television adaptation of Mars Ravelo's Filipino superheroine Darna, entitled "Patuloy Lang Ang Lipad". On August 3, they were revealed as one of the guest performers on the upcoming "HIH All Access: The He's Into Her Grand Finale Concert". On August 14, the original soundtrack of Darna (2022 TV series), "Patuloy Lang Ang Lipad", was released. On August 15, BGYO's official light stick revealed, named as "The Light". On September 2, BGYO took part on Kumu is 4 U: A Birthday Concert. On September 5, the group embarked on their first-ever Mindanao show TNT Saya Fest sa Tuna Festival. On September 8, the group took part on the Lazada 9.9 Megasale Super Show. On September 13, BGYO performed Tumitigil Ang Mundo on It's Showtime and spilled partial details on their upcoming sophomore album.

In the last quarter of 2022, BGYO unveiled their sophomore album "BE:US" with "Magnet" as the lead single and the album's key track, "PNGNP". The group also participated on "EK’s 27th Pre-Anniversary Concert:P-pop Day" (October 9), "TNT Saya Fest sa Zamboanga Hermosa" (October 11), and "Mr. Music: The Hits of Jonathan Manalo" (October 15). On October 20, "Magnet" was officially released. On October 29, "Hallyuween 2022" took place; where the group performed The Light, The Baddest, Kundiman and Magnet. As part of their second album Be Us campaign, the group embarked on a US promo tour, which includes their visit at the TikTok Headquarters in Los Angeles, their performance on the Wish USA Bus, and a street performances at the Time Square and Union Square in New York City. On November 19, the group was featured on MYX Hits Different. On November 25, Tumitigil Ang Mundo was released as part of the An Inconvenient Love Original Soundtrack.

Artistry
BGYO have cited BTS, Exo, GOT7, Wanna One, Seventeen, NCT, WayV, Stray Kids, TXT, Treasure, Big Bang, Twice, Shawn Mendes, Ed Sheeran, Justin Bieber, Kendrick Lamar, Gary Valenciano, Iñigo Pascual, Erik Santos and Regine Velasquez as musical inspirations. In an interview with Myx Global, the group have also cited Jabbawockeez as an influence, with Nate saying "the Jabbawockeez inspired me to get into music, and would even copy how they would dance".

Legacy and cultural impact

Legacy
BGYO's emergence in the music industry came in the midst of a gut-wrenching pandemic and in an era where Filipinos have already taken inspiration from emotional songs (in Tagalog slang "hugot songs"), BGYO does not pull off an effort to take a different lane to inspire many people through their motivational songs based on their triumphant journey to success, with JE CC of Lionheartv described The Light album as powerful, inspiring, anthemic; calling it "a refreshing scene in a very vulnerable time". Tessa Mauricio-Arriola, Editor for Entertainment, Lifestyle and STM of The Manila Times noted that "BGYO emerge as an entire popstar package [despite] pandemic". Aside from their music, BGYO are known as idols pursuing their studies amidst their growing career with Bianca Custodio of Candymag elaborated in an article, saying "the fact that they’re doing all of this while studying only demonstrates how disciplined and determined these boys really are. We stan men who are both beauty and brains!" and Jhon Dave Cusipag of The Philippine Star saying "Idols in academics".

Cultural impact
As early as their trainee days, BGYO as "SHA Boys" became the youth ambassadors of the National Youth Commission. In their debut year, BGYO were dubbed as the "Aces of P-pop" and considered as "P-pop's Breakout Act of 2021", known for notable vocals, synchronized dance moves, commanding stage presence, and undeniable visuals; with John Alfred Esmilla of Villagepipol calling BGYO "as The Baddest performers," with Metro.Style saying "since their debut, BGYO has been making waves in the local music scene...they're bringing in a new flavor to the ever-evolving P-Pop genre", and experienced performer Vhong Navarro saying "I bow to you. Very good!". Tessa Mauricio-Arriola, Editor for Entertainment, Lifestyle and STM of The Manila Times explained "they have the makings of OPM superstars... can genuinely serve as role models for today's youth". Similar sentiments with the editor-in-chief of the Xpedition Magazine, Josh M. Yugen, stressing BGYO as "a true role model for the modern youth". In an interview with Push, Ez Mil shared that he likes to do a collaboration with BGYO and expressed his admiration to the group's work ethics, saying "they have an excellent work ethic and it’s something that runs in blood". In one of their performances on the Philippines' noontime show It's Showtime, the hosts were impressed with BGYO and praised their song "Tumitigil Ang Mundo" with Vice Ganda saying "Para tayong dinalaw ng bagyo rito diba! Ang lakas ng datingan ng sayawan at kantahan. Ang ganda-ganda ng kanta niyo."

Fandom 
According to JE CC of RAWR magazine, "ACEs are becoming a key ingredient in sustaining BGYO's forward momentum as it brews to an even more massive P-Pop storm"; with Katie Rojas of PARCINQ, considering "ACEs" as the pivotal to the success [of] the band; per Bianca Custodio of Candymag, saying "the ACEs have definitely proven to be the group's ultimate, well, ace!". Based on the 2022 Twitter Philippines Trends Report released on July 28, BGYO named as one of the key players and most talked-about P-pop groups in the Philippines associated with the conversations of fandoms in the platform that serves as empowerment with the current and upcoming Filipino idol groups.

Endorsements

A year after their official debut, BGYO have gained several endorsement deals in various industries in their career. On February 10, 2022, BGYO became one of the ambassadors of Xiaomi Redmi Note 11 series. Since February 17, 2022, BGYO have been H&M brand ambassador and became the first Filipino artist to be featured on the brand's initiative "Music x ME" campaign, which aims to promote and put the spotlight on up and coming OPM artists. On April 2, 2022, BGYO was introduced as the fresh faces of Mentos and the voices of the brand's newest campaign jingle "Say Yes! To Fresh". BGYO has also served as the brand ambassadors for Smart TNT, Chowking and Sprite with their voices in the campaign "Cool Ka Lang". As the first P-Pop boy group to take over the VIP online community, BGYO partnered with Viber, to give fans an exclusive chance to connect, with the group, online through the "Backstage Pass Channel".

In September 2022, BGYO took part on the first-ever collaboration of H&M with the Filipino streetwear "Don't Blame the Kids (DBTK)".

Other ventures

Philanthropy
On November 16, 2019, as the youth ambassadors of National Youth Commission, the group took part in the "FitFil Youth Against Drugs and Obesity" campaign held at the SM Mall of Asia.

On November 28, 2020, the group participated a virtual fundraising concert hosted by TikTok Philippines for the benefit of those affected by typhoons which was participated with other artists and vloggers in the Philippines. On December 8, 2020, BGYO with sister group BINI held a joint auction charity event called "#BINIficiaryAucSHAn" for the benefit of Typhoon Ulysses victims donated to the Cagayan and Isabela relief operations through ABS-CBN Foundation – Sagip Kapamilya. The project raised ₱125,642 from the groups' auctioned trainee shirts and other belongings plus a fund raised via Kumu. On December 20, the group performed on ABS-CBN's Christmas special entitled "KTnX ang Babait Ninyo: ABS-CBN Christmas Special Fundraising Show" for the segment "P-Pop Rise"—a benefit show for the survivors and evacuees of areas hit by typhoons Rolly and Ulysses.

On March 28, 2021, the group was invited to perform on a benefit concert organized by director Cathy Garcia Molina for NICKL Entertainment. They also took part on Election 2022 coalition's virtual campaign that hopes to mobilize and encourage Filipino citizens to register and vote.

On January 25, 2022, the group took part on a interactive benefit show "Truth or Dare" along with other "Kapamilya" heartthrobs and leading men and on April 2, 2022, on a benefit Mobile Legends game against the fans named "Star Magic Game Zone" along with other "Kapamilya" artists, as part of the fundraising activities of the ABS-CBN Foundation under the "Tulong-Tulong sa Pag-Ahon: Isang Daan sa Pagtutulungan" campaign for Typhoon Rai (known in the Philippines as Typhoon Odette) survivors. On July 12, they visited the children of "St. Joseph Homes for Special Children" in Tarlac City as a subsidiary event of "BE YOU: The World will Adjust Benefit Concert".

Webcast
On March 19, 2021, BGYO signed with the live streaming platform, Kumu, to promote campaigns.

Members

Discography

Studio albums
 The Light (2021)
 Be Us (2022)

Filmography 

Films
BINI & BGYO Dubai Adventures: A Docufilm (2022)

Series
 ONE DREAM: The Bini - BGYO Journey (2021)

Television
ASAP Natin 'To (2020–present)

Online shows
 BGYO on KUMU Live (2020–present)
 BGYO on the Go (2022)

Concerts and tours 

Headlining concerts and tours
Be The Light: The BGYO Launch (2021)
Best Time with BGYO Mall Tour (2022)
BGYO Celestial Spaces: H&M Concert from the Virtual Universe (2022)

Awards and nominations

International

Local

Listicles

See also
2021 in Philippine music
2022 in Philippine music

Notes

References

External links

 
 

 
Musical groups established in 2020
Filipino boy bands
Filipino pop music groups
21st-century Filipino musicians
Star Magic
Vocal quintets
Star Music artists
ABS-CBN personalities
Musical quintets
2020 establishments in the Philippines
Musical groups from Metro Manila
English-language singers from the Philippines